Lord Rees may refer to:
Peter Rees, Baron Rees (1926–2008), British politician and barrister
Martin Rees, Baron Rees of Ludlow (born 1942), British cosmologist and astrophysicist

See also 
William Rees-Mogg, Baron Rees-Mogg (1928–2012), British journalist